Fantastix is the fourth studio album by J-pop duo Two-Mix, released by King Records on December 22, 1997. It includes the singles "True Navigation" (image song from the Japanese dub of The X-Files season 3), "Summer Planet No. 1" (commercial image song for Tokyo Telemessage's "P-Press"), and "Living Daylights" (ending theme of TV Asahi's broadcast of NBA Tonight). The album also includes the song "Break", which was featured in the anime series Case Closed.

The album peaked at No. 11 on Oricon's weekly albums chart. It was also certified Gold by the RIAJ.

Track listing 
All lyrics are written by Shiina Nagano; all music is composed by Minami Takayama; all music is arranged by Two-Mix.

Charts

Certification

References

External links 
 
 

1997 albums
Two-Mix albums
Japanese-language albums
King Records (Japan) albums